The 1999 Nigerian Senate election in Edo State was held on February 20, 1999, to elect members of the Nigerian Senate to represent Edo State. Victor Oyofo representing Edo North, Oserheimen Osunbor representing Edo Central and Roland Owie representing Edo South all won on the platform of the Peoples Democratic Party.

Overview

Summary

Results

Edo North 
The election was won by Victor Oyofo of the Peoples Democratic Party.

Edo Central 
The election was won by Oserheimen Osunbor of the Peoples Democratic Party.

Edo South 
The election was won by Roland Owie of the Peoples Democratic Party.

References 

Edo
Edo
Edo State Senate elections